Mikko is a Finnish masculine given name and equivalent of the English name Michael, having been borrowed into the Finnish language. The given name Mikko is shared by the following notable people:

 Mikko Alatalo, Finnish musician and politician
 Mikko Eloranta, Finnish ice hockey left winger
 Mikko Franck, Finnish conductor
 Mikko Heiniö, Finnish composer
 Mikko Hirvonen, Finnish World Rally Championship driver
 Mikko Hyppönen, Finnish security guru and author
 Mikko Ilonen, Finnish golfer
 Mikko Juva, Finnish historian, theologian, and archbishop
 Mikko Kavén, Finnish footballer
 Mikko Koivu, Finnish ice hockey centre
 Mikko Kolehmainen, Finnish flatwater canoer
 Mikko Korhonen, Finnish golfer
 Mikko Koskinen, Finnish ice hockey goaltender
 Mikko Larkas, Finnish basketball coach
 Mikko Leppilampi, Finnish actor and musician
 Mikko Lindström, guitarist for Finnish band HIM
 Mikko Nissinen, Finnish ballet dancer and current director of Boston Ballet
 Mikko Paananen, bassist for the Finnish band HIM
 Mikko Rantanen, Finnish ice hockey forward
 Mikko Ruutu, Finnish ice hockey forward
 Mikko Sirén, drummer of Finnish band Apocalyptica
 Mikko Tuomi, Finnish astronomer
 Mikko Vainonen, Finnish ice hockey defenceman

Mikko is also the name of these other entities:
 Mikko (restaurant), a Nordic restaurant in Washington, D.C.

Notes

Uralic personal names
Finnish masculine given names